Prorella desperata is a moth in the family Geometridae first described by George Duryea Hulst in 1896. It is found in the US states of Arizona and Texas.

The wingspan is about 17–19 mm. There is a strongly oblique, dark, antemedian band on the forewings, as well as a rectangular, preapical, costal patch and small blotches on the terminal area opposite the cell and above the
tornus. Adults have been recorded on wing in August and September.

References

Moths described in 1896
Eupitheciini